Turkey was neutral during World War II. But Turkish cargo ships were frequently sunk or damaged by the warring nations. In the following list those ships which were sunk or damaged during the war by the warring nations are shown.

Except for Adana,  Duatepe and Antares all of these ships were sunk. Usually the crew were taken prisoner. But the human casualty was heavy in Refah and Mefkure cases. In Refah, 168 people on way for training and in Mefkure 301 Jewish refugees were lost.

On 14 July 1942 Turkish submarine TCG Atılay was sunk as a result of a naval mine explosion in the strait of Dardanelles. 38 sailors were drowned. But the mine was probably a World War I mine.

References

Lists of ships of Turkey
World War II ships of Turkey
World War II shipwrecks